WTCM may refer to:

 WTCM (AM), a radio station (580 AM) licensed to Traverse City, Michigan, United States
 WTCM-FM, a radio station (103.5 FM) licensed to Traverse City, Michigan, United States
 SIRRIS, knowledge centre for the technology industry in Belgium, formerly known as CRIF-WTCM